Buzaaya was a Basoga chiefdom in what is today Uganda. It was founded around 1720 and lasted until 1906, when it was incorporated into the united Busoga protectorate and its royal line was terminated.

References

History of Uganda